Torkkelinmäki (Finnish), Torkelsbacken (Swedish) is a central neighborhood of Kallio, Helsinki, Finland. Its boundaries are Hämeentie on the east, Helsinginkatu on the north, Kaarlenkatu on the west and Viides linja on the south. Like elsewhere in Kallio, the area's apartments are small, for the most part consisting of one or two rooms.

There are more inhabitants in this small city quarter than in many small cities (7,172 as of 1 January 2015) and the quarter provides employment to 1,225 people (as of 31 December 2013). The population density -  - is Finland's largest and in the same class as that of Manhattan. The quarter's border streets, Hämeentie, Helsinginkatu and Kaarlenkatu are densely lined with tall apartment buildings. The neighbourhood  offers good cafés and restaurants to residents and visitors.

The centre of Torkkelinmäki is different from the surrounding areas of the city, it is rather compact and picturesque. It was built in 1926-28 Nordic Classicism style with large gardens and parks, the streets are narrow and curved, and the buildings are usually located in the centre of their lot.

Torkkelinmäki transport links are excellent most times of the day, although no public transport lines run through its streets. Sörnäinen metro station is located in the northeast corner of the area and Hakaniemi in the opposite direction. Most bus lines going to northern and north-eastern parts of Helsinki and the capital region run along the eastern border street. Also, majority of the Helsinki tram lines have their routes along the border streets of this neighbourhood. There are also Helsinki City Bikes stations at each of the four corners of the area.

Notes

Kallio